Callionymus bifilum, the Northwestern Australian deepwater dragonet, is a species of dragonet native to the Indian Ocean off of western Australia.

References 

B
Fish described in 2000
Taxa named by Ronald Fricke